Christos Hatzis (born 1953) is a Juno Award-winning Greek-Canadian composer. Many of his compositions are performed internationally, and he is a professor at the Faculty of Music, University of Toronto.

Early life and education
Hatzis was born in Volos, Greece and received his early music instruction at the Volos branch of the Hellenic Conservatory. He continued his musical studies in the United States, first at the Eastman School of Music (B.M 1976 and M.M 1977) and later at the State University of New York (SUNY) at Buffalo (Ph.D. 1982). His composition teachers include Morton Feldman, Lejaren Hiller, Wlodzimierz Kotonski, Samuel Adler, Russell Peck, Joseph Schwantner and Warren Benson.

Career
Hatzis immigrated to Canada in 1982 and became a Canadian citizen in 1985. He composed music related to Christian spirituality, particularly his Byzantine heritage, and the Canadian Inuit culture.  In addition to composing and teaching, Hatzis has written extensively about composition and contemporary music.

He won the Jules Léger Prize for New Chamber Music  in 1996.

In 1998, Hatzis received the Jean A. Chalmers National Music Award.  He won two Juno Awards in 2006, including Best Classical Composition for String Quartet No. I (The Awakening), which was recorded by the St. Lawrence String Quartet.

Hatzis won another Juno in 2008 for his work Constantinople; it combined music and visual media and is musically eclectic, featuring jazz, classical, and eastern elements.  The work was performed at  halls at Banff and Toronto during the summer and fall of 2004, to critical acclaim from the Toronto Star and the Calgary Herald.  Constantinople has been performed internationally.

His projects include a commission from violinist Hilary Hahn, a piece for bass clarinet, string orchestra and audio playback commissioned by Jeff Reilly, and a new work based on poems by Elizabeth Bishop, commissioned by soprano Suzie Leblanc and Symphony Nova Scotia.  On 12 November 2010, Hatzis' piece Credo was performed by George Dalaras, a popular Greek singer, and CityMusic Cleveland Orchestra in Avery Fisher Hall in New York. He also composed a piece for the CBC as part of a multinational Millenium Project.

Hatzis composed the score for the Royal Winnipeg Ballet production Going Home Star; the two-CD recording by the Winnipeg Symphony won a Juno Award in 2017.

He is a member of the Canadian Music Centre. His works are published by Promethean Editions.

Compositions

Orchestra

Credo (2010)
Redemption: Book 1 (2009)
Mirage? (2009)
Tongues of Fire (2007)
Rebirth (2006)
Telluric Dances (2005)
Christos Anesti (2004)
Sepulcher of Life (2004)
K 627: Concerto for Piano and Orchestra in F Major in the Spirit of W. A. Mozart (2003)
Light from the Cross (2002)
Pyrrichean Dances (2001)
From the Book of Job (2001)
Farewell to Bach (1998)
Confessional  (1997)
Zeitgeist, (1996)
Concerto for Flute and Chamber Orchestra (1993)
The Gouldberg Variations, 1992
Mortiferum Fel, (1985–1990)
Omen, (1985)

Choral

Mysterion Xenon (2012)
Psalm 91 (2008)
From the Song of Songs (2008)
WATER (2008)
Easter Kontakion (2007)
Wormwood (2005)
Four Rituals for Percussion Quintet, Choir and Audience (2004)
The Troparion of Kassiani (2004)
Sepulcher of Life (2004)
LIGHT (Arctic Dreams 2) (2003)
Everlasting Light (1999)
De Angelis (1999)
Kyrie (1997)
Heirmos (1994)

Chamber

Symbol of Faith  (2009)
Coming To (2009) - For Hillary Hahn
Dystopia (2009) - For Hillary Hahn
Anaktoria (1990 rev. 2009)
Arabesque (2009)
Afterthoughts 2 (2007)
Lazy Afternoons by the Lake (2007)
Mystical Visitations (2006)
Through a Glass Darkly (2005)
Cruel Elegance (2004) - For the St. Lawrence Quartet
Four Rituals for Percussion Quintet, Choir and Audience (2004) - For NEXUS
Parlor Music (2004) - For Beverley Johnston and the Amici Trio
Afterthoughts 1 (2002)
Constantinople (2000) - For the Gryphon Trio
String Quartet No. 2 (The Gathering)  (1999) - For the St. Lawrence Quartet
Melisma (1995) - Commissioned by Jean-Guy Boisvert
Three Songs on poems by Sappho (1993)
Burial Ground (In Memoriam: Chari Polatos) (1993) - Commissioned by the Fifth Species woodwind quintet
Erotikos Logos (1991)
Stylus (1990) - Commissioned by Peter Hannan, Douglas Perry and Joseph Petric
On Cerebral Dominance (1987)
Arcana (1983) - Commissioned by Arraymusic

Mixed media

In the Fire of Conflict (2008)
LIGHT (Arctic Dreams 2) (2003)
Arctic Dreams 1 (2002)
Constantinople (2000)
Fertility Rites (1997) - Commissioned by Beverley Johnston
Tetragrammaton (1995) - Commissioned by Anne-Marie Donovan
String Quartet No. 1 (The Awakening) (1994) - Commissioned by the Smith Quartet
Of Threads and Labyrinths (1994) - Commissioned by Soundstreams Canada for Lawrence Cherney and Erica Goodman
From the Vanishing Gardens of Eden (1992) - Commissioned by CBC Radio
Byzantium (1991) - for oboe and electronics - Commissioned by the Shobana Jeyasingh Dance Company
The Birth of Venus (1990) - Commissioned by Robert Black
The Mega4 Meta4 (1990) - Douglas Perry
Pavillons En l' Air (1989) - Commissioned by CBC Radio for Scott Irvine and Beverley Johnston
Orbiting Garden (1989) - Commissioned by The Music Gallery for Anthony de Mare
Orbiting Garden (1991) - Commissioned by the Laidlaw Foundation accordion version for Joseph Petric
Crucifix (1988)
Nadir (1988) - Commissioned by the Canadian Electronic Ensemble for Peter Hannan and Rivka Golani
Equivoque (1985) - Commissioned by Joseph Petric

Radiophonic

Viderunt Omnes (1998)
Footprints in New Snow (1996)
The Idea of Canada (1992)
The Temptation of St. Anthony (1987)

References

External links
christoshatzis.com (Composer's website)

1953 births
Living people
Canadian male composers
Academic staff of the University of Toronto
Jules Léger Prize for New Chamber Music winners
Canadian classical composers
Juno Award for Classical Composition of the Year winners
Male composers
EMI Classics and Virgin Classics artists
20th-century Canadian composers
21st-century Canadian composers
Musicians from Volos
Greek emigrants to Canada
Eastman School of Music alumni
University at Buffalo alumni
20th-century Canadian male musicians
21st-century Canadian male musicians